New Rochelle Historic Site is a designation of the Historical and Landmarks Review Board (HLRB), for buildings, structures, monuments and other historically significant properties in the city of New Rochelle in Westchester County, New York.  Significant sites are chosen after meeting a combination of criteria, including historical, economic, architectural, artistic, cultural, and social values.

Settled by French refugees in the 1680s, New Rochelle grew from a farming community to a resort town to a suburban community before being incorporated as a city in 1899 and is now the seventh largest city in the state.

In 1998 a consultant for the Historical and Landmarks Review Board was commissioned to prepare a Reconnaissance Level Cultural Resources Survey, an analysis of the most significant historic sites and structures in New Rochelle. The project inventoried one historic district and 78 individual properties that fall within a broad spectrum of land use categories. The principal goal of the survey was to identify the City’s most treasured historic and architectural resources which are documented on New York State inventory forms. Each individual resource was evaluated with respect to its eligibility for listing in the National Register of Historic Places. The report follows the format established by SHPO, including the methodology for the survey, criteria for the selection of resources to be inventoried, a historical overview of the project area, a summary of cultural themes identified in the survey, an examination of the stylistic development of historic architecture in New Rochelle, and a narrative description of the existing conditions of the project area.

Listings

Below is the list of New Rochelle Historic Sites, including names, dates of construction, location details and additional background information if available.

See also
 National Register of Historic Places listings in New Rochelle, New York

References

 01
.
Lists of buildings and structures in New York (state)